The Abd al-Kuri sparrow (Passer hemileucus) is a passerine bird endemic to the small island of Abd al Kuri (also spelled several other ways) in the Socotra archipelago of the Indian Ocean, off the Horn of Africa. Though this species was originally described as a distinct species, it was considered conspecific with the Socotra sparrow. A study by Guy Kirwan showed significant differences from the Socotra sparrow, and that the two sparrows might even have different origins. On the evidence that it is morphologically distinct, BirdLife International (and hence the IUCN Red List) recognised it as a species, and it was listed in the IOC World Bird List from December 2009. It has a very restricted distribution, and a population of under 1,000 individuals, so despite not having any known threats it is considered a Vulnerable species on the IUCN Red List.

References

Works cited

Abd al-Kuri sparrow
Endemic birds of Socotra
Abd al-Kuri sparrow